Christofer "Chris" Toumazou, FRS, FREng, FMedSci, FIET, FIEEE, FCGI, FRSM, CEng (born 5 July 1961) is a British Cypriot electronic engineer.

In 2013 he became London's first Regius Professor of Engineering conferred to Imperial College London during the Queen's Diamond Jubilee. Toumazou is also Chief Scientist of the Institute of Biomedical Engineering and Professor of Circuit Design at Imperial; Founder of Toumaz Holdings Ltd, Executive chairman and founder of DNA Electronics Ltd., Chief Scientific Advisor to GENEU and a co-founder of DNAnudge.

He has been involved in developing new technologies, mainly in the medical field, creating a research institute and a number of commercial ventures to commercialise his research. Toumazou invented and licensed Portable and Rapid Semiconductor Genome Sequencing which has now become a multimillion-dollar industry. One of his motivators was the diagnosis of his 13-year-old son with end stage kidney failure through a rare genetic mutation.

He has published over 500 research papers and holds 50 patents in the field of semiconductors and healthcare. Toumazou's career began with the invention and development of novel concept of current-mode analogue circuitry for ultra-low-power electronic devices.

For his inventions on semiconductor based genetic testing he won the Gabor Medal of the Royal Society (2013) and European Inventor Award (2014). He is the first British winner of the prize in this contest since 2008.

Biography

Early life
Born to Greek-Cypriot parents in Cheltenham, it was expected he would follow his family by going into catering. He later trained to become an electrician, and was inspired by an English uncle who was an electrical engineer.

Academic career
Toumazou began undergraduate studies in 1980. He obtained both his undergraduate degree and doctorate at the then Oxford Polytechnic (now Oxford Brookes University). He moved to Imperial College London in 1986 as a Research Fellow in the Department of Electrical and Electronic Engineering becoming the youngest professor at Imperial in 1994 at the age of 33. He was appointed Head of the Circuits and Systems Group in the Department of Electrical and Electronic Engineering and then Head of the Department of Bioengineering in 2001.

In 2003 he raised a total of £22m to create the Institute of Biomedical Engineering at Imperial College London, a multidisciplinary research institute focusing on personalised medicine and bionanotechnology. He became its first Director and Chief Scientist. His own specialism is in the field of personalised healthcare, providing worn or implantable devices for early diagnosis and detection of disease.

His research and entrepreneurial actions have shown how natural analogue physics of silicon semiconductor technology can be used to mimic and replace biological functions. Examples of this include cochlear implants for born-deaf children, an artificial pancreas for type 1 diabetics, wireless heart monitors for personalised ambulatory health monitoring pre- and post- operatively, inventing semiconductor-based DNA sequencing and inventing an intelligent neural stimulator as a drug alternative for obesity.

He has given numerous public lectures and keynote addresses at a national and international level. In 2011 he was invited to speak at the TEDMED conference in San Diego.
Other lectures include the G8 Summit (2013) and Royal Society public talk (2011).

He was elected Fellow of the Royal Society (2008), Fellow of the Royal Academy of Engineering (2008) and Fellow of the Academy of Medical Sciences (2013), making him one of a handful in the UK who are fellows of all three premier societies.

Regius Professorship
Toumazou was awarded a prestigious Regius professorship, recognising the highest standard of research and teaching in the Faculty of Engineering. Announced on 29 January 2013, the honour was granted by the Queen as part of her 60th anniversary celebrations. David Willetts, Minister for Universities and Science, said: "I was incredibly impressed by the quality and range of the applications received and am delighted that twelve new Regius Professorships are to be created. Together, the successful applications demonstrated an exceptionally high level of achievement in both teaching and research

Commercial career
He has been involved with a number of commercial ventures, including the invention and development of the world's first analogue and digital mobile phone for the largest mobile phone cellular operator in Thailand. Since then, his entrepreneurial focus has been applied to a range of electronic devices which harness semiconductor chip technology to provide significant improvements in health and patient care.

He has co-founded technology-based companies using silicon technology for early detection and management of chronic disease: Toumaz Technology Ltd and DNA Electronics Ltd. These companies are examples of the successful translation of innovative inter-disciplinary research into disruptive market-driven products with practical benefits for patients.

Toumazou founded DNA Electronics in 2001 recognising that by merging microchip technology with genetic chemistry and DNA sequencing he was able to invent, develop and commercialise a new revolution in genetic point-of-care diagnostics and DNA sequencing. The technology launched in 2010 as "ion semiconductor sequencing" and has been licensed to Thermo Fisher Scientific. DNA Electronics Ltd, is developing rapid near-patient live diagnostics providing actionable information to clinicians. DNAe's priority focus is a test for blood stream infections for use in the management and prevention of sepsis.

Honours and awards
2022 UNESCO-Equatorial Guinea International Prize for Research in the Life Sciences
2020 Joint Entrepreneur of the Year Award, UK BioIndustry Association (BIA)
2016 Honoured with Lifetime Achievement accolade at Elektra European Electronics Industry Awards http://www.electronicsweekly.com/news/elektra-awards-news/elektra-awards-2016-winners-2016-12/
2014 Awarded IEEE Biomedical Engineering Award 2015 http://www.ieee.org/about/awards/tfas/biomed_eng.html
2014 Awarded Faraday Medal of the Institution of Engineering and Technology (IET) 
2014 Honorary Fellowship, Cardiff University 
Winner of 2014 European Inventor Award of the European Patent Office
2013 Awarded Gabor Medal of the Royal Society
2013 Awarded Regius Professorship
2013 Elected Fellow of the Academy of Medical Sciences
2013 Speaker at G8 Innovation Conference  
2012 Honorary DSc, Mahanakorn University, Thailand 
2011 Public Lecture Bioinspired technology: from cochlear implants to an artificial pancreas 
2011 Speaker at TEDMED in San Diego, USA
2011 Awarded IET J. J. Thomson Medal for Electronics
2010 Elected Fellow of the City and Guilds Institute
2010 Honorary DEng from Oxford Brookes University
2009 Who's Who in the World 16th Edition
2008 Elected Fellow of The Royal Society
2008 Elected Fellow of the Royal Academy of Engineering
2007 Silver Medal of the Royal Academy of Engineering for pioneering work on current-mode design
2007 Elected Member of Academia Europaea – one of only two engineers elected
2005 IEEE CAS Education Award for pioneering contributions to telecommunications and biomedical circuits and systems
2004 Elected Fellow of IEE, UK
2003 Awarded The Royal Society Clifford Paterson Lecture
2000 Elected Fellow of IEEE, USA
1993 Recipient of the IEE Electronics Letters Premium Award
1992 Recipient of the IEEE CAS Outstanding Young Author Award
1991 Recipient of the IEE Rayleigh Best Book Award

References

External links 

 
 Radio interview with Chris Toumazou, on The Life Scientific, BBC Radio 4.

1961 births
Academics of Imperial College London
Living people
Fellows of the Royal Academy of Engineering
Fellows of the Royal Society
Alumni of Oxford Brookes University
People from Cheltenham
Fellows of the Academy of Medical Sciences (United Kingdom)